Pornography addiction is the popular but unscientific application of an addiction model to the use of pornography. Pornography may be part of compulsive sexual behavior with negative consequences to one's physical, mental, social, or financial well-being. While the World Health Organization's ICD-11 (2022) has recognized compulsive sexual behaviour disorder (CSBD) as an "impulsive control disorder", CSBD is not an addiction, and the American Psychiatric Association's DSM-5 (2013) and the DSM-5-TR (2022) do not classify compulsive pornography consumption as a mental disorder or a behavioral addiction.

Problematic Internet pornography viewing is viewing of Internet pornography that is problematic for an individual due to personal or social reasons, including the excessive time spent viewing pornography instead of interacting with others and the facilitation of procrastination. Individuals may report depression, social isolation, career loss, decreased productivity, or financial consequences as a result of their excessive Internet pornography viewing impeding their social life.

Symptoms and diagnosis

Universally accepted diagnostic criteria do not exist for pornography addiction or problematic pornography viewing. Pornography addiction is often defined operationally by the frequency of pornography viewing and negative consequences. The only diagnostic criteria for a behavioral addiction in the current Diagnostic and Statistical Manual of Mental Disorders are for pathological gambling, and they are similar to those for substance abuse and dependence, such as preoccupation with the behavior, diminished ability to control the behavior, tolerance, withdrawal, and adverse psychosocial consequences. Diagnostic criteria have been proposed for other behavioral addictions, and these are usually also based on established diagnoses for substance abuse and dependence.

A proposed diagnosis for hypersexual disorder includes pornography as a subtype of this disorder. It included such criteria as time consumed by sexual activity interfering with obligations, repetitive engagement in sexual activity in response to stress, repeated failed attempts to reduce these behaviors, and distress or impairment of life functioning. A study on problematic Internet pornography viewing used the criteria of viewing Internet pornography more than three times a week during some weeks, and viewing causing difficulty in general life functioning.

According to the American Society of Addiction Medicine, some psychological and behavioral changes characteristic of addiction brain changes include addictive cravings, impulsiveness, weakened executive function, desensitization, and dysphoria. BOLD fMRI results have shown that individuals diagnosed with compulsive sexual behavior (CSB) show enhanced cue reactivity in brain regions associated traditionally with drug-cue reactivity. These regions include the amygdala and the ventral striatum. Men without CSB who had a long history of viewing pornography exhibited a less intense response to pornographic images in the left ventral putamen, possibly suggestive of desensitization. ASAMs position is inconsistent with the American Association of Sex Educators, Counselors, and Therapists, who cite lack of strong evidence for such classification, describing ASAM as not informed by "accurate human sexuality knowledge".

Neuropsychopharmacological and psychological researches on pornography addiction conducted between 2015 and 2021 have concluded that most studies have been focused entirely or almost exclusively on men in anonymous settings, and the findings are contradicting. Some researchers support the idea that pornography addiction qualifies as a form of behavioral addiction into the umbrella construct of hypersexual behavior and/or a subset of compulsive sexual behavior (CSB), and should be treated as such, whereas others have detected the increased activation of ventral striatal reactivity in men for cues predicting erotic but not monetary rewards and cues signaling erotic pictures, therefore suggesting similarities between pornography addiction and conventional addiction disorders.

Despite the fact that pornography is being highly spuriously indicted as a public health crisis in the United States and elsewhere, with problematic Internet and online pornography use reported to constitute an increasing burden in public mental health since the 2000s, psychopathological models and diagnostic criteria have lacked consensus, and the body of evidence on the effectiveness of therapeutic approaches is still scarce.

Diagnostic status
The status of pornography addiction as an addictive disorder, rather than simply a compulsivity, has been hotly contested. Furthermore, research suggests that the use of a pornography addiction label may indicate a socially (as opposed to clinically) driven nosology 

In November 2016, the American Association of Sexuality Educators, Counselors and Therapists (AASECT) issued a position statement on sex/porn addiction which states that AASECT "does not find sufficient empirical evidence to support the classification of sex addiction or porn addiction as a mental health disorder, and does not find the sexual addiction training and treatment methods and educational pedagogies to be adequately informed by accurate human sexuality knowledge. Therefore, it is the position of AASECT that linking problems related to sexual urges, thoughts or behaviors to a porn/sexual addiction process cannot be advanced by AASECT as a standard of practice for sexuality education delivery, counseling or therapy."

The Diagnostic and Statistical Manual of Mental Disorders (DSM-5) includes a new section for behavioral addictions, but includes only one disorder: pathological gambling. One other behavioral addiction, internet gaming disorder, appears in the conditions proposed for further study in DSM-5. Psychiatrists cited a lack of research support for refusing to include other behavioral disorders at this time.

Porn addiction is not a diagnosis in DSM-5 (or any previous version). "Viewing pornography online" is mentioned verbatim in the DSM-5, but it is not considered a mental disorder either.

A number of studies have found neurological markers of addiction in internet porn users, which is consistent with a large body of research finding similar markers in other kinds of problematic internet users. Yet other studies found that critical biomarkers of addiction were missing, and most addiction biomarkers have never been demonstrated for pornography.

The International Classification of Disorders 11 (ICD-11) rejected "pornography addiction". Specifically, the World Health Organization (WHO) wrote: "Based on the limited current data, it would therefore seem premature to include [Internet use] in ICD-11."

However, ICD-11 does include the "Compulsive sexual behaviour disorder" (CSBD) in the "impulse control disorders" section. It is defined as "a persistent pattern of failure to control intense, repetitive sexual impulses or urges resulting in repetitive sexual behaviour." David J. Ley argued that that is not an endorsement of the concept of pornography addiction.

Introductory psychology textbook authors Coon, Mitterer and Martini, passingly mentioning NoFap, speak of pornography as a "supernormal stimulus" but use the model of compulsion rather than addiction. Addiction and compulsion are models of mental disorders which cancel each other out, the term "addiction" being deprecated, anyway ICD-11 does not support the existence of "porn addiction"/"sex addiction". While it has not been proven that either porn or masturbation addiction exist, porn or masturbation compulsion probably exist.

The role pornography plays in the neuropsychological development of adolescents is not well understood, due to a lack of empirical research. While experimental research in the area presents considerable ethical challenges, a review (2021) which compiled evidence from other empirical sources such as surveys found that representations of women in pornography may lead adolescent boys to view women mainly as sexual objects, with probable repercussions for gender equality. The review, however, nowhere claims that it has shown a causal relationship from mainstream pornography viewing to perspectives furthering gender inequality. Besides, it nowhere states if the correlation found is large or small, numbers for it are not given either.

Peter and Valkenburg (2016) 20 years systematic review: its positive conclusions are tentative, and causality cannot be shown. Brown and Wisco (2019) systematic review: idem ditto.

DSM-5-TR, published in March 2022, does not recognize a diagnosis of sexual addiction/compulsion (which would include internet pornography viewing).

ICD-11 has added pornography to CSBD. However, this is categorized as an impulse control disorder, not an addictive disorder. It has been argued that the CSBD diagnosis is not based upon sex research.

Neither DSM-5, nor DSM-5-TR, nor ICD-10, nor ICD-11 recognize sex addiction or porn addiction as a valid diagnosis.

Treatment
Cognitive-behavioral therapy has been suggested as a possible effective treatment for pornography addiction based on its success with internet addicts, though no clinical trials have been performed to assess effectiveness among pornography addicts as of 2012. Acceptance and commitment therapy has also been shown to be a potentially effective treatment for problematic internet pornography viewing.

Online pornography

Some clinicians and support organizations recommend voluntary use of Internet content-control software, internet monitoring, or both, to manage online pornography use. Sex researcher Alvin Cooper and colleagues suggested several reasons for using filters as a therapeutic measure, including curbing accessibility that facilitates problematic behavior and encouraging clients to develop coping and relapse prevention strategies. Cognitive therapist Mary Anne Layden suggested that filters may be useful in maintaining environmental control. Internet behavior researcher David Delmonico stated that, despite their limitations, filters may serve as a "frontline of protection."

Medications

Studies of those with non-paraphilic expressions of hypersexuality have hypothesized that various mood disorders, as defined in the DSM, may occur more frequently in sexually compulsive men.

Compulsive sexual behavior has been treated with antidepressants including SSRIs and serotonin-norepinephrine reuptake inhibitors. Naltrexone, a medication used to inhibit reward mechanisms in opiate or alcohol addictions, other mood-stabilizers, and anti-androgens.

Epidemiology
There is only one representative sample (published in 2017) to date concerning distress about sex video use. They found that of 10,131 women surveyed, 0.5% of women agreed with the statement that they were "addicted" to pornography; 1.2% (of 4,218 who viewed) when limited to women who say they viewed sex films. The comparable figure limiting to men who view sex films was 4.4%. This was without any clinical screening that should eliminate primary disorders (e.g., depression) or religious-based concerns, so these should be considered high-end estimates for potential disorders, if any exist.

Most studies of rates use a convenience sample. One study of a convenience sample of 9,265 people found that 1% of Internet users have concerns about their Internet use and 17% of users meet criteria for problematic sexual compulsivity, meaning they score above one standard deviation of the mean on the Kalichman Sexual Compulsivity Scale. A survey of 84 college-age males found that 2060% of a sample of college-age males who use pornography found it to be problematic. Research on internet addiction disorder indicates rates may range from 1.5 to 8.2% in Europeans and Americans.

Society and culture

Support groups
Several support groups exist for people who wish to quit pornography use and/or believe to be addicted to pornography. Twelve-step programs such as Sex Addicts Anonymous (SAA), Sexaholics Anonymous (SA), Sex and Love Addicts Anonymous (SLAA), Sexual Recovery Anonymous (SRA), and Sexual Compulsives Anonymous (SCA) are fellowships of men and women who share their experience, strength and hope with each other so they may overcome their common problem and help others recover from addiction or dependency by using the twelve-step program borrowed from Alcoholics Anonymous (AA) and other recovery tools.

NoFap is website and community forum founded in 2011 that serves as a support group for those who wish to give up pornography and masturbation. It serves as a support group for those who wish to avoid the use of pornography, masturbation, and/or sexual intercourse. Recent peer-reviewed data highlighted considerable levels of misogyny along with a poor understanding of human sexuality and relationships within this online community. The Daily Dot and Der Spiegel linked NoFap to recent gender-based murders and breeding domestic terrorism.

Fight the New Drug, a Salt Lake City-based non-profit organization, is a non-religious and non-legislative organization which seeks to inform and educate individuals regarding pornography usage with science and personal stories. It is aimed at the youth demographic to raise awareness of potential problems with pornography. There is also a PornFree reddit group which focuses on giving up porn rather than masturbation.

Celebrate Recovery is a Christian inter-denominational twelve-step program with about 35,000 available groups and is open to any person who is struggling with life's bad habits, hurts, and hang-ups. Celebrate Recovery was started in 1991 at Saddleback Church in California, and their program is based on the Beatitudes from the biblical Sermon on the Plain and the twelve-step program from Alcoholics Anonymous.

Political and religious motivation

According to professor , a sexologist working for the Academic Medical Center, it is usually the American religious right which claims the existence of pornography addiction and such claims are rare (scarce) among sexologists. A 2018 meta-analysis showed a correlation between a person being religious and perceiving themself as having a pornography addiction, possibly due to people using pornography despite their religion prohibiting it.

According to Addicted to Lust: Pornography in the Lives of Conservative Protestants (2019) written by Samuel L. Perry, assistant professor of sociology and religious studies at the University of Oklahoma, conservative Protestants in the United States are characterized by a "sexual exceptionalism" related to their consumption of pornography due to certain pervasive beliefs within the Conservative Protestant subculture, which entails cognitive dissonance associated with the unfounded conviction to be addicted to pornography, psychological distress, and intense feelings of guilt, shame, self-loathing, depression, and sometimes withdrawal from faith altogether.

Perry's book received widespread media coverage and his findings were criticized by Lyman Stone of the Evangelical magazine Christianity Today, which asserted that both the quantitative and qualitative statistical data collected by Perry demonstrate that the consumption of pornography in the United States is significantly lower among church-attending Protestant Christians compared to other religious groups, and declared that "Protestant men today who attend church regularly are basically the only men in America still resisting the cultural norm of regularized pornography use".

The overwhelming majority of all websites and YouTube channels devoted to anti-masturbation and anti-porn addiction propaganda, channels and websites supporting NoFap included, are, according to various sources, owned by far-right Christian fundamentalists and conservative biblical inerrantists, and also are entirely political in nature. Various psychologists, medical doctors, and social scientists noticed that the traditional Christian obsession with combating sexual thoughts, desires, and activities, including masturbation, is unhealthy and unwholesome, and this also applies to secular advocacy of anti-pornography and anti-masturbation, including 16 U.S. states' legislatures which have declared that pornography is a "public health crisis".

The American Psychiatric Association had by then already dismissed such moral panic ("political stunt") in DSM-5 (published in 2013), and DSM-5-TR, published in March 2022, does not recognize a diagnosis of sexual addiction (which would include internet pornography viewing).

Emily F. Rothman, Professor of Community Health Sciences at the Boston University School of Public Health, stated in 2021 that "the professional public health community is not behind the recent push to declare pornography a public health crisis".

Mainstream media
In 2013, American actor Joseph Gordon-Levitt wrote, directed, and starred in the comedy-drama film Don Jon, in which the protagonist is addicted to pornography. In an interview to promote the film, Gordon-Levitt discussed what he referred to as the "fundamental difference between a human being and an image on a screen".

In 2014, American actor Terry Crews talked about his long-standing pornography addiction, which he said had seriously affected his marriage and life and which he was able to overcome only after entering rehab in 2009. He now takes an active role in speaking out about pornography addiction and its impact.

In 2015, English comedian Russell Brand appeared in videos by American anti-pornography group Fight the New Drug, in which he discussed pornography and its harmful effects. Later that year, American actress Rashida Jones produced the documentary Hot Girls Wanted, which gave an in-depth look into the exploitation of women in the pornography industry.

In 2016, American comedian Chris Rock and his wife Malaak Compton divorced after 20 years of marriage, which Rock attributed to his infidelity and pornography addiction. He later discussed the details of his pornography addiction in his 2018 stand-up comedy special Tamborine.

See also

 Accountability software
 Anti-pornography movement
 Content-control software
 National Center on Sexual Exploitation
 Rational Recovery
 Sexaholics Anonymous
 Sex Addicts Anonymous
 Sexual ethics
 Sexual addiction

References

Further reading
 Klein, M. (2017). His Porn, Her Pain: Confronting America’s Porn Panic With Honest Talk About Sex Praeger
 Cooper, Al (2002). Sex and the Internet: A Guidebook for Clinicians Routledge
 P. Williamson, S. Kisser (1989).  Answers In the Heart: Daily Meditations for Men and Women Recovering from Sex Addiction Hazelden
 Patrick Carnes (2001). Out of the Shadows: Understanding Sexual Addiction Hazelden
 Sex Addicts Anonymous
 Rosenberg, Matthew (1999). “Understanding, Assessing, and Treating Sexual Offenders: Tools for the Therapist, downloadable version on stopoffending.com

External links
Pornography addiction at Medical News Today

Research on the effects of pornography
Sexual addiction
Behavioral addiction